Darcy Vincent McDougall (16 April 1886 – 7 April 1952) was an Australian rules footballer who played with Collingwood in the Victorian Football League (VFL).

Notes

External links 
		
Darcy McDougall's profile at Collingwood Forever	

1886 births
1952 deaths
Australian rules footballers from Melbourne
Collingwood Football Club players
Sturt Football Club players
South Adelaide Football Club players
People from Clifton Hill, Victoria